WAMD is a commercial AM radio station broadcasting on 970 kHz based in Aberdeen, Maryland. The station is owned by Bill Parris. Reception for WAMD is northern Harford County. The station's radio format is predominantly Top 40. WAMD is part of the KHZ Network, which includes sister stations WYRE Annapolis and WKHZ Easton.

Sale of the station from Salem Broadcasting to Parris was announced on December 15, 2010.  During its ownership of the station, Salem Broadcasting reduced WAMD's daytime power from 500 watts to 300 watts and reduced its broadcast coverage to enable then-co-owned WNYM in the New York City area to increase its daytime power from 5 kW to 50 kW.
WNYM also broadcasts on 970 AM. WAMD's nighttime power remains at 500 watts.

WAMD returned to the airways April 23, 2011 under the management of Bill Parris. WAMD is broadcasting the KHZ network in simulcast with WYRE and WKHZ.  Considered a multimedia platform with an internet TV channel playing videos and the audio on the networked radio stations, personalities such as Tracy Hart work as VJs.

References

External links
 http://www.khztv.com/station/wamd

FCC History Cards for WAMD

AMD
Harford County, Maryland